The Billboard Tropical Songs chart is a music chart that ranks the best-performing tropical songs of the United States. Published by Billboard magazine, the data are compiled by Nielsen Broadcast Data Systems based on each single's weekly airplay.

Chart history

See also
 List of number-one Billboard Hot Tropical Songs of 2005
 List of number-one Billboard Hot Latin Tracks of 2004
 List of number-one Billboard Hot Latin Pop Airplay of 2004

References

2004
2004 in Latin music
United States Tropical Songs